Kashkashian may refer to:

 Kim Kashkashian, American violist
 8994 Kashkashian, an asteroid named after Kim Kashkashian